This is a list of equipment used by the Turkmen Ground Forces.

Light weapons

Combat vehicles

Artillery

Army air defence

Drones

References 

Turkmen Ground Forces
Military of Turkmenistan